Catherine Betty Abigail Behrens (24 April 1904 – 3 January 1989), known as Betty Behrens and published as C. B. A. Behrens, was a British historian and academic. Her early interests included Henry VIII, Charles II, and the early modern period of English history, with her later research focused on the Ancien Régime (the Kingdom of France from the Middle Ages to the French Revolution). She was elected a Fellow of Newnham College, Cambridge in 1935, and moved to become a Fellow of Clare Hall, Cambridge after the publication of The Ancien Régime (1967). She "achieved an international reputation" with The Ancien Régime, with reviews describing it as "remarkable and absorbing" and "a lively, thought-provoking essay in historical revision".

Early life and education
Behrens was born on 24 April 1904 in London, England. Her father was Noel Edward Behrens (1879–1967), a Jewish civil servant and banker who had inherited a large amount of money from his father. Her mother Vivien Behrens (1880–1961), the daughter of Sir Cecil Coward, was a Christian. She was educated at home by a series of governesses and never attended school. She spoke French and English from an early age and later added German.

In 1923, Behrens matriculated into Lady Margaret Hall, Oxford to study modern history. She graduated in 1926 with a first class Bachelor of Arts (BA) degree. She was awarded a Commonwealth Fellowship to Radcliffe College, a women's liberal arts college in Cambridge, Massachusetts, United States, in 1928.

Academic career
Having returned to the United Kingdom, Behrens held research posts at Bedford College, London and at University College, Oxford. In 1935, she was elected a Fellow of Newnham College, Cambridge. Additionally, she was appointed an assistant lecturer in the Faculty of History, University of Cambridge in 1938 and promoted to lecturer the following year. Her research in the mid-1930s was focused on Henry VIII, and she published academic papers on this period including on his divorce and on resident diplomats. Her interests moved to later English history and she published an article on Charles II in 1941.

As with many academics, Behrens offered her services during the Second World War. Therefore, she left academia for some years to work in Whitehall, where she was likely assigned to the Ministry of War Transport. After the war ended, she spent ten years researching and writing an analysis of the role of British-controlled merchant ships during the war for the official  History of the Second World War.

Behrens then turned to a new topic, the French Ancien Régime and the French Revolution. She wrote attacks on the prevailing Marxist view of the causes of the revolution. In 1967, she published her magnum opus, The Ancien Régime. The book brought her short-term fame and a place among the Anglo-American intellectual élite. That year, she also moved from Newnham College to Clare Hall, a newly founded postgraduate-only college of the University of Cambridge. She retired from full-time academia in 1972, but continued to be an active academic as a fellow emerita of Clare Hall from 1972 to 1986. Her final book, Society, government and the Enlightenment: the experiences of eighteenth-century France and Prussia, was published in 1985; she was eighty-one.

Personal life
In 1966, Behrens married E. H. Carr, a fellow historian and former diplomat. By the time of his death in 1982, they had been living apart for a number of years.

Behrens died on 3 January 1989.

Selected works

References

External links 
 Papers of Betty Behrens, held at Churchill Archives Centre
 The Betty Behrens Seminar on Classics of Historiography, Clare Hall, Cambridge

1904 births
1989 deaths
20th-century British historians
British women historians
British medievalists
Women medievalists
Historians of the French Revolution
Fellows of Newnham College, Cambridge
Fellows of Clare Hall, Cambridge
Alumni of Lady Margaret Hall, Oxford
20th-century British women writers